Angelo Sguazzero (born 4 January 1946, in Como) is a former Italian sprinter, that finished 7th with the national relay team on 4x100 metres relay at the 1968 Olympic Games.

Biography
Angelo Sguazzero participated at one edition of the Summer Olympics (1968), he has 8 caps in national team from 1965 to 1969.

Achievements

See also
 Italy national relay team

References

External links
 

1946 births
Sportspeople from Como
Italian male sprinters
Athletes (track and field) at the 1968 Summer Olympics
Olympic athletes of Italy
Living people